Norvell Township is a civil township of Jackson County in the U.S. state of Michigan. The population was 2,963 at the 2010 census.  The township is named after John Norvell, one of Michigan's first U.S. senators.

Communities 
It is situated at the outlet of Norvell Lake on the River Raisin. William Hunt, the first white settler in the area, arrived in 1831. A post office was established on March 17, 1838, with Harvey Austin as the first postmaster. It was a station on the Lake Shore and Michigan Southern Railway in 1878. The community was named for John Norvell, one of the first U.S. senators from Michigan.
Vineyard Lake is an unincorporated community and census-designated place (CDP) in the southwest corner of the township.  The CDP also extends into Columbia Township to the west.

Schools 

 Columbia School District
 Grass Lake School District

Recreation 

 Watkins Lake State Park and County Preserve
 Camp O' the Hills Girl Scouts Camp
 Camp Liberty - Camp Liberty provides inclusive outdoor recreation programs that aid in the reintegration of U.S. military service members, veterans, and their families, with an emphasis on assisting those with post-traumatic stress and traumatic brain injuries
 Hollerfest - A family friendly celebration of local music, food, and community held at Frog Holler Farm

Geography

Norvell Township occupies the southeast corner of Jackson County. It is bordered to the east by Washtenaw County and to the south by Lenawee County.

The township contains  of Watkins Lake State Park and County Preserve, owned by the Michigan Department of Natural Resources.

Demographics
As of the census of 2000, there were 2,922 people, 1,135 households, and 831 families residing in the township. The racial makeup of the township was 97.26% White, 0.62% African American, 0.51% Native American, 0.10% Asian, 0.14% from other races, and 1.37% from two or more races. Hispanic or Latino of any race were 0.68% of the population.

There were 1,135 households, out of which 29.8% had children under the age of 18 living with them, 63.9% were married couples living together, 5.7% had a female householder with no husband present, and 26.7% were non-families. 22.2% of all households were made up of individuals, and 8.2% had someone living alone who was 65 years of age or older.  The average household size was 2.56 and the average family size was 3.00.

In the township the population was spread out, with 23.9% under the age of 18, 6.0% from 18 to 24, 27.6% from 25 to 44, 29.0% from 45 to 64, and 13.6% who were 65 years of age or older.  The median age was 41 years. For every 100 females, there were 107.1 males.  For every 100 females age 18 and over, there were 107.9 males.

The median income for a household in the township was $49,167, and the median income for a family was $55,221. Males had a median income of $45,756 versus $29,625 for females. The per capita income for the township was $20,488.  About 6.9% of families and 6.6% of the population were below the poverty line, including 3.3% of those under age 18 and 14.2% of those age 65 or over.

Gallery

References

External links
Norvell Township official website

Townships in Jackson County, Michigan
Townships in Michigan
Populated places established in 1894
1894 establishments in Michigan